The George Washington Colonials women's basketball team represents George Washington University, located in Washington, D.C. It plays its home games in the Charles E. Smith Center, which is also the venue for other George Washington Colonials athletic programs. The team competes in the Atlantic 10 Conference.

History
George Washington began play in 1975. They joined the Atlantic 10 Conference in 1983. Since joining the conference, they have won the regular season title 16 times, winning it in 1994 (shared), 1995, 1996, 1997, 1998, 2000 (West), 2002, 2003, 2004 (West), 2005 (West), 2006 (shared), 2007, 2008 (shared), 2015, 2016, and 2017 (shared). They have also won the A-10 Tournament in 1992, 1995, 1996, 2003, 2015, 2016, and 2018. In 1997, the Colonials made their four straight NCAA Tournament appearance and sixth in seven years. In the ensuing tournament, the Colonials (ranked as a 5 seed) went all the way to the Elite Eight. They beat Northwestern 61–46, Tulane 81–67, and North Carolina 55–46 before losing to Notre Dame 62–52 in the regional final. As of the end of the 2015–16 season, the Colonials have an all-time record of 748–448.

NCAA tournament results

References

External links